The BVG Class 480 is an electric multiple unit for the Berlin S-Bahn. It was originally meant to replace the aging S-Bahn rail cars in West Berlin, but after the reunification of the city, the remaining orders were cancelled and replaced by new orders for DBAG Class 481 cars in 1993.

History

Class 480 cars were ordered by BVG because the Class 475 trains, which had been taken over from Deutsche Reichsbahn (DR) when BVG took control of the S-Bahn in West Berlin in 1984, were inadequate for use in West Berlin and were outdated. Both ends of a four-unit Class 480 train has a driving cab, allowing the flexibility of having two multiple units together. Four prototypes were delivered in 1986.

As a result of in incident in the Nord-Süd Tunnel in August 2004, in which the last vehicle in a train was destroyed by fire, class 480 trains were removed from routes S1, S2 and S25, Bringing Class 481 trains into the service on these routes ahead of plan. These trains were redeployed to other lines such as S41, S42, S45 and S8. S85 also decided to use these trains.

Deployment of trains 
These trains were deployed and commonly been seen at various lines:
S41: Ring (clockwise)
S42: Ring (counter-clockwise)
S45: Flughafen Schönefeld - Berlin-Südkreuz
S46: Königs Wusterhausen – Westend
S47: Spindlersfeld – Hermannstraße
S8: Zeuthen – Birkenwerder
S85: Grünau – Pankow

Electric multiple units of Germany
Berlin S-Bahn
Train-related introductions in 1986
750 V DC multiple units
Siemens multiple units